Take Five Live is a 1962 live album by American jazz singer Carmen McRae with pianist Dave Brubeck, focusing on interpretations of his songs. This was McRae's second album with Brubeck; their first, Tonight Only with the Dave Brubeck Quartet, was released in 1961.

Track listing
All tracks composed by Dave Brubeck and Iola Brubeck; except where indicated
"When I Was Young"
"In Your Own Sweet Way" 
"Too Young for Growing Old" 
"Ode to a Cowboy" 
"There'll Be No Tomorrow" 
"Melanctha" (D. Brubeck, Liz Blake)
"It's a Raggy Waltz" (D. Brubeck)
"Oh So Blue" (D. Brubeck)
"Lord, Lord" 
"Travellin' Blues" 
"Take Five" (Paul Desmond, I. Brubeck)
"Easy as You Go"

Personnel 
Carmen McRae - vocals
The Dave Brubeck Quartet
(except Paul Desmond - alto saxophone)
Dave Brubeck - piano
Gene Wright - double bass
Joe Morello - drums

References

1962 live albums
Carmen McRae live albums
Columbia Records live albums
Dave Brubeck live albums
Albums recorded at Basin Street East